Richard Rosen (born 1947) is a "renowned" teacher of modern yoga. He has written five books on yoga.

Life

Rosen began practicing yoga in 1980. He trained in Iyengar Yoga in San Francisco between 1982 and 1986, and has taught yoga ever since then. He, Clare Finn, and Rodney Yee founded the Piedmont Yoga Studio (now called "Nest Yoga") in Oakland in 1987. He is a contributing editor of the Yoga Journal and president of the Yoga Dana Foundation. He has written hundreds of reviews of yoga books and videos for magazines including Yoga Journal, and has given workshops in countries around the world.

He has had Parkinson's disease for over 15 years and continues to teach yoga and pranayama including to people with the condition.

Works

 2002: The Yoga of Breath: A Step-by-Step Guide to Pranayama. Shambhala Publications, 
 2004: Yoga for 50+. Ulysses, 
 2006: Pranayama: Beyond the Fundamentals. Shambhala Publications, 
 2012: Original Yoga: Rediscovering Traditional Practices of Hatha Yoga. Shambhala Publications, 
 2017: Yoga FAQ: Almost Everything You Need to Know About Yoga from Asana to Yama. Shambhala Publications,

References

External links 

 

American yoga teachers
1947 births
Living people